Mike Hiss (7 July 1941 – 19 December 2018) was an American driver in the USAC Championship Car series. He raced in the 1972–1976 seasons, with 28 career starts, including the Indianapolis 500 in 1972–1975. He finished in the top ten 13 times, with his best finish in 2nd position in 1972 at Ontario. His 7th-place finish at Indy in 1972 earned him the title of Rookie of the Year.

Hiss was the centerfold of the first preview issue of Playgirl published in January 1973. He was briefly married to Arlene Hiss, the first woman to start a USAC Champ Car event.

Complete motorsports results

American Open-Wheel racing results
(key) (Races in bold indicate pole position, races in italics indicate fastest race lap)

SCCA National Championship Runoffs

Indy 500 results

† Qualified Car for Mario Andretti who was driving Formula 1

USAC Champ Car results
(key) (Races in bold indicate pole position)

NASCAR Winston Cup Series results
(key)

References

External links

Driver Database Profile
Where Are They Now Article

Can-Am entrants
Indianapolis 500 drivers
Indianapolis 500 Rookies of the Year
People from Tustin, California
Racing drivers from California
1941 births
2018 deaths
SCCA National Championship Runoffs participants
Riverview High School (Sarasota, Florida) alumni

Team Penske drivers